Banjački is a secret language used by bricklayers from Podrinje region (eastern Bosnia and western Serbia).

The language was invented by brickworkers from Osat in eastern Bosnia and later spread to surrounding regions. Brickworkers use it when they want to hide something from their employers. Serbian author Dragan Panić classifies it as a variant of šatrovački.

Samples

See also
 Meshterski
 Purishte

Literature

References

Serbian language
Occupational cryptolects